Euphaedra afzelii, the green Ceres forester, is a butterfly in the family Nymphalidae. It is found in Sierra Leone. The habitat consists of dense forests.

Similar species
Other members of the Euphaedra ceres species group q.v.

References

Butterflies described in 1867
afzelii
Endemic fauna of Sierra Leone
Butterflies of Africa
Taxa named by Baron Cajetan von Felder
Taxa named by Rudolf Felder